The 1978–79 Pepperdine Waves men's basketball team represented Pepperdine University in the 1978–79 NCAA Division I men's basketball season. The team was led by head coach Gary Colson. The Waves played their home games at the Firestone Fieldhouse and were members of the West Coast Athletic Conference. They finished the season 22–10 (later adjusted to 23–9), 10–4 in WCAC play to finish second in the regular season standings. Pepperdine received a bid to the NCAA tournament. In the opening round, the Waves beat No. 8 seed Utah before falling to No. 1 seed UCLA, 76–71.

Roster

Schedule and results

|-
!colspan=9 style=| Non-Conference Regular Season

|-
!colspan=9 style=| WCAC Regular Season

|-
!colspan=9 style=| NCAA Tournament

Source

References

Pepperdine Waves men's basketball seasons
Pepperdine
Pepperdine
Pepperdine Waves Men's Basketball
Pepperdine Waves Men's Basketball